Jinghe may refer to:

Places in China 
Jing River, a river in Gansu and Shaanxi provinces
Jinghe County, Börtala Mongol Autonomous Prefecture, Xinjiang
Jinghe Town, Xinjiang, in Jinghe County
Jinghe, Hebei, in Hejian, Hebei
Jinghe, Hunan, in Xiangyin County, Hunan
Jinghe, Jiangsu, in Baoying County, Jiangsu
Jinghe Subdistrict, Hunchun, in Hunchun, Jilin
Jinghe Subdistrict, Tengzhou, in Yicheng District, Shandong (see List of township-level divisions of Shandong)
Jinghe Subdistrict, Wuhan, in Dongxihu District, Hubei
 Jinghe station, on the Wuhan Metro

People 
 Pan Jinghe, Chinese Indonesian landlord and social activist
 Paul Liu Jinghe, Chinese bishop